Cebu Doctors’ University Hospital (CDUH), known as Cebu Doctors' Hospital until 2006, is a major tertiary private hospital in Cebu City, Philippines. The 300-bed hospital was inaugurated on August 20, 1972.

History
Cebu Doctors' Hospital is a comprehensive medical education and research complex. In the Visayas and Mindanao region of the Philippines, the CDUH was the first hospital offering nuclear medicine services, commencing in 1990. It was also the first hospital in the region to acquire a 64 slice MSCT, in 2006.

In 2011 Cebu Doctors' University Hospital was accredited by QHA Trent Accreditation from the UK.

References

External links 
 Cebu Doctors' University Hospital (CDUH)

Hospital buildings completed in 1972
Hospitals in the Philippines
Buildings and structures in Cebu City
Hospitals established in 1972
20th-century architecture in the Philippines